The 2019 Western Michigan Broncos football team represented Western Michigan University in the 2019 NCAA Division I FBS football season. The Broncos played their home games at Waldo Stadium in Kalamazoo, Michigan, and competed in the West Division of the Mid-American Conference. The team was led by third-year head coach Tim Lester.

History
In 1906 The first football team for Western was created. At that time what is now Western Michigan University was named Western State Normal School. In 1907 Western hired Bill Spaulding as the first official coach for the team.

Western's team was originally known as the Hilltoppers and in 1939 it was approved to change its nickname to the Broncos. The new name was suggested by coach John Gill.

Preseason

Recruiting

MAC media poll
The MAC released their preseason media poll on July 23, 2019, with the Broncos predicted to finish in second place in the West Division.

Schedule
The following table lists WMU's schedule.

Game summaries

Monmouth

at Michigan State

Georgia State

at Syracuse

Central Michigan

at Toledo

Miami (OH)

at Eastern Michigan

Bowling Green

Ball State

at Ohio

at Northern Illinois

vs. Western Kentucky (First Responder Bowl)

References

       

Western Michigan
Western Michigan Broncos football seasons
Western Michigan Broncos football